Gnathophausia is a genus of lophogastrid crustacean. There are 10 species recognized in the genus Gnathophausia:
Gnathophausia affinis G. O. Sars, 1883
Gnathophausia childressi Casanova, 1996
Gnathophausia elegans G. O. Sars, 1883
Gnathophausia fagei Casanova, 1996
Gnathophausia gigas Willemoes-Suhm, 1875
Gnathophausia gracilis Willemoes-Suhm, 1875
Gnathophausia ingens (Dohrn, 1870)
Gnathophausia longispina G. O. Sars, 1883
Gnathophausia scapularis Ortmann, 1906
Gnathophausia zoea Willemoes-Suhm, 1875

References

External links

Image of Gnathophausia ingens

Malacostraca